Maher Zdiri (born 5 September 1970) is a Tunisian footballer. He played in ten matches for the Tunisia national football team from 1993 to 1998. He was also named in Tunisia's squad for the 1998 African Cup of Nations tournament.

References

External links
 

1970 births
Living people
Tunisian footballers
Tunisia international footballers
1998 African Cup of Nations players
Association footballers not categorized by position